Tak-e Ab Band (also Romanized as Tak-e Āb Band and Tag-e Āb Band; also known as Takā Band) is a village in Qaen Rural District, in the Central District of Qaen County, South Khorasan Province, Iran. At the 2006 census, its population was 167, in 51 families.

References 

Populated places in Qaen County